The 1985 Virginia Slims of California was a women's  tennis tournament played on indoor carpet courts in Oakland, California, in the United States. It was part of the 1984 Virginia Slims World Championship Series and was played from February 18 through February 24, 1985. Sixth-seeded Hana Mandlíková won the singles title.

Finals

Singles
 Hana Mandlíková defeated  Chris Evert-Lloyd 6–2, 6–4

Doubles
 Hana Mandlíková /  Wendy Turnbull defeated  Rosalyn Fairbank /  Candy Reynolds 4–6, 7–5 6–1

Notes

References

External links
 ITF tournament edition details
 Tournament draws

Virginia Slims Of California, 1985
Silicon Valley Classic
Virginia Slims of California
Virginia Slims of California
Virginia Slims of California